Dorothy's Victory is the sixth studio album by Norwegian band Bel Canto, released on 27 February 2002 by EMI.

Reception 

Verdens Gang reviewer Kurt Bakkemoen awarded the album dice 5, and Dagbladet reviewer Håkon Molset awarded the album dice 3.

Track listing

Personnel

Musicians
 Anneli Drecker – vocals, keyboards, piano
 Nils Johansen – guitar, stick bass, keyboards, bass, violin, programming
 Andreas Eriksen – percussion
 Richard Lowe – keyboards, programming
 Gaute Barlindhaug – keyboards, programming
 Thomas Tofte – bass 
 Peter Baden – drums 
 Henning Leh – additional guitar 
 Bjørn Fløystad, Espen Berg, Vidar Ersfjord – additional keyboards 
 Stefan Kvarnström – drums, piano, drum programming 
 Sindre Hotvedt – strings programming 
 Jonny Sjo – bass 
 Karl Oluf Wennerberg – drums 
 Espen Grjotheim – backing vocals 
 Torbjørn Brundtland – keyboards, piano, programming 
 "Tale of Urashima Taro" recitation – Hiroshi Tamaoki

Technical
 Anneli Drecker, Nils Johansen, Torbjørn Brundtland – production
 Espen Berg – production, mixing 
 The Feverish Fumbling Fingers Team – co-production 
 Richard Lowe – co-production 
 Stefan Kvarnström – engineering
 Anneli Drecker, Richard Lowe, Michael Ilbert, Ulf Holand – mixing

Charts

References 

2002 albums
Bel Canto (band) albums
EMI Records albums